Radoslav Yankov (born January 26, 1990) is a snowboarder from Bulgaria. He competed for Bulgaria at the 2014 Winter Olympics in the alpine snowboarding events (parallel and giant slalom).

Yankov's first World Cup win came at the Men's Parallel Giant Slalom (PGS) event held in Carezza on December 12, 2015.

During the 2016–17 season he made great results in PGS, winning the overall title for that season.

World Cup

Podiums

Season titles
 1 title – (1 overall)

Season standings

References

External links 
 
 

1990 births
Living people
Bulgarian male snowboarders
Olympic snowboarders of Bulgaria
Snowboarders at the 2014 Winter Olympics
Snowboarders at the 2018 Winter Olympics
Snowboarders at the 2022 Winter Olympics
People from Smolyan
Competitors at the 2015 Winter Universiade